The Fungor or Fungs are an ethnic group of Sudan. Several thousand members of this ethnic group live in Sudan. They speak Fungor, a Benue-Congo language. Their state of origin is South Kurdufan.

Culture and society 
The Fungors mainly engage in agriculture. The most common crops they cultivate are cotton, sorghum, and peanuts.

Most Fungors are Muslim.

References

Joshua Project

Nuba peoples
Ethnic groups in Sudan